Poliochne, often cited under its modern name Poliochni, was an ancient settlement on the east coast of the island of Lemnos. It was settled in the Late Chalcolithic and earliest Aegean Bronze Age and is believed to be one of the most ancient towns in Europe, preceding Troy I.  Anatolian features of the earliest layers were affected by cultural influences from Helladic Greece, about the start of Early Helladic II, ca. 2500 BC.

The site, with houses huddled together sharing party walls, was unearthed by excavations of the Italian School of Archaeology at Athens (Scuola archeologica Italiana di Athene), beginning in 1930. It is believed that Troy was its main rival commercially; a rivalry that led to the decline of Poliochne circa 2000 BC.

Archaeology

Following initial soundings, regular campaigns at Poliochne were undertaken under A. Della Seta (it) in 1931-36, when they were suspended. Following Della Seta's death, excavations were resumed in 1951-53, 1956 and 1960.

During 1994-1997, Greek archaeologists discovered a more recent Bronze Age settlement on the tiny uninhabited island of Koukonesi situated in the Moudros harbour, west of Poliochne. This settlement was developed circa 2000-1650 BC, and the findings again prove commercial ties with Asia Minor, and with Aegean islands and mainland Greece.  Mycenaean ceramics of the 13th century BC found on Koukonesi could prove that, around when the traditional era of the Trojan War took place, the Greeks had a permanent settlement there, rather than just a commercial outpost, understanding the importance of the straits connecting the Aegean and the Black Sea.

See also
Skarkos

Notes

Bibliography

External links
 Official website
 Limnos - History

Former populated places in Greece
Mycenaean sites
Ancient Lemnos
Cycladic civilization